Tommy Habeeb Enterprises is an entertainment production company headed by Tommy Habeeb.  Current shows in production include STAG, Billionaires Car Club hosted by Andrew Firestone, and Art of War 3 which airs live on September 1, 2007 on Events iN Demand and Dish Network.

Current Shows 

STAG
Billionaires Car Club
Art of War 3

External links
Official Website
STAG Official Website
Billionaires Car Club Official Website
Art of War 3 Pay-Per-View

Television production companies of the United States